The Church of Saint Nicholas of Kavala is a Greek Orthodox Church in the town of Kavala, in Eastern Macedonia and Thrace, Greece. It was built during Ottoman period as Ibrahim Pasha Mosque before it was converted into a church in modern times.

History 
The building was erected in 1530 during the Ottoman rule of Macedonia as an Islamic mosque, perhaps on the site of a pre-existing Christian church, by Ibrahim Pasha, vizier to Sultan Suleiman the Magnificent, and it was the largest mosque in Kavala.

In the 1920s the mosque was converted into a church for Christian worship, dedicated to Saint Nicholas; the bell-tower was built upon the base of the destroyed minaret. On the eastern side of the church there is a mural depicting the arrival of Apostle Paul in the port.

Gallery

See also 

 Islam in Greece
 List of mosques in Greece
 List of former mosques in Greece
 Conversion of mosques into non-Islamic places of worship

References

Bibliography

Further reading

External links 
 

Ottoman mosques in Greece
Former mosques in Greece
Churches converted from mosques
Buildings and structures in Kavala
Mosque buildings with domes
16th-century mosques
16th-century architecture in Greece
Macedonia under the Ottoman Empire
Eastern Orthodoxy in Greece
Churches in Greece